Kuruthipunal is a Tamil language novel written by Indira Parthasarathy. A revolutionary novel, it was based on the Kilvenmani massacre that took place in Thanjavur district in 1968. The novel won the Sahitya Akademi award for its author in 1977. The novel inspired Kann Sivanthaal Mann Sivakkum, a 1983 Tamil film, which in turn won a National Award. The novel has been translated into multiple languages including English, Hindi, Bengali, Oriya, Gujarati and Malayalam.

References 

Indian novels adapted into films
Novels set in the 1960s
Novels set in India
Sahitya Akademi Award-winning works
Tamil novels
Novels set in Tamil Nadu